Stadion Olympic (Albanian:Stadioni Safari) is a football stadium in Ulcinj, Montenegro near the border with Albania. It hosts the home games of OFK Federal of the South Region Youth League. The capacity of the stadium is 1500 spectators.

In 2012, it was the host stadium of Barcelona Soccer Academy Camp in Ulcinj.

See also 
Stadion Olympic

Multi-purpose stadiums in Montenegro
Football venues in Montenegro
Sport in Ulcinj